is a 2018 Japanese dark fantasy anime television series based on a video game of the same name created and developed by Otomate for PlayStation Vita. The series is directed by Masahiro Takata at Zero-G, written by Tomoko Konparu, character design and chief animation direction by Yukie Sakō, and music composed by Tomoki Hasegawa. The series premiered on Tokyo MX, Sun TV and BS Fuji from April 8 2018, and concluded on June 24, 2018.

In an alternate universe, where the Taisho era ended in 1936, Tsugumi Kuze agrees to an arrange marriage to save her family, but her brother commits suicide afterwards. Before she can make sense of the situation, the Imperial Library Information Assets Management Bureau appears before her with a mysterious book called Maremono.

Episode list

Reception

Critical reception
Rebecca Silverman of Anime News Network gave the series a solid B rating, and stated "It's a dark story, but one with interesting aspects and an engaging vocal cast, and one that's really worth checking out".

References

External links
 

Anime television series based on video games
Dark fantasy anime and manga
Male harem anime and manga
Zero-G (studio)